The translations of One Thousand and One Nights have been made into virtually every major language of the world. They include the French translation by Antoine Galland (titled Les mille et une nuits, finished in 1717). Galland's translation was essentially based on a medieval Arabic manuscript of Syrian origins, supplemented by oral tales recorded by him in Paris from a Maronite Arab from Aleppo named Hanna Diyab.

The first English translation appeared in 1706 and was made from Galland's version; being anonymous, it is known as the Grub Street edition. It exists in two known copies kept in the Bodleian Library and in the Princeton University Library. Since then several English reissues appeared simultaneously in 1708. As early as the end of the 18th century the English translation based on Galland was brought to Halifax, Montreal, Philadelphia, New York and Sydney. Galland-based English translations were superseded by that made by Edward William Lane in 1839–41. In the 1880s an unexpurgated and complete English translation, The Book of the Thousand Nights and a Night, was made by Richard Francis Burton.

The original scattered Arabic texts were collected in four corpuses: the so-called Calcutta I or the Shirwanee Edition (1814–18, 2 volumes), Bulaq or the Cairo Edition (1835, 2 volumes), Breslau Edition (1825–38, 8 volumes) and Calcutta II or the W.H. Macnaghten Edition (1839–42, 4 volumes). Some translations starting from Galland were censored due to lewd content.

French translations

Galland

Galland based his translation on what is now known as the Galland Manuscript, a three-volume (or perhaps once four-volume) manuscript from the fourteenth or fifteenth century now kept in the National Library of France. He published his translation in a twelve-volume set between 1704 and 1717.  Galland's translation altered the style, tone and content of the Arabic text. Designed to appeal, it omitted sophisticated or dark elements while enhancing exotic and magical elements and became the basis of most children's versions of One Thousand and One Nights.

Mardrus
In 1926–1932 a lavishly decorated 12-volume edition of J. C. Mardrus' translation, titled Le livre des mille nuits et une nuit, appeared. Soviet and Russian scholar Isaak Filshtinsky, however, considered Mardrus' translation inferior to others due to presence of chunks of text, which Mardrus conceived himself to satisfy the tastes of his time. According to Robert Irwin, "Mardrus took elements which were there in the original Arabic and worked them up, exaggerating and inventing, reshaping the Nights in such a manner that the stories appear at times to have been written by Oscar Wilde or Stéphane Mallarmé". In response to criticism of his translation by academic Arabists, Mardrus promised to produce a tome of learned commentary and justificatory pieces which he, however, failed to do.

Russian translations

The first Russian translation of One Thousand and One Nights, in Russian:  (Týsjača i odná nočʹ), was made by Alexey Filatyev in 1763–1774. It was based on Galland's translation and consisted of 12 volumes. Later Russian translations were also based on European translations. For instance, a three-volume translation by Yulia Doppelmayr (1889–1890) was based on Galland, the six-volume translation by Lyudmila Shelgunova (1894) was based on that by Edward William Lane and an anonymous translation (1902–1903) was based on Mardrus.

The first Russian translation directly from the Arabic source (from Calcutta II) was made by Mikhail Salye and published in eight volumes by Academia in 1929–1939. Salye also translated into Russian seven tales not contained in Calcutta II (from the manuscript in the National Library of Russia).

English translations
Unlike the Grub Street version, Jonathan Scott made the first literal translation of Galland. This rendition, entitled The Arabian Nights Entertainments, appeared in 1811.

Henry Torrens would later translate the first fifty nights from Calcutta II, which were published in 1838. Having heard that Edward William Lane had begun his own translation, Torrens abandoned his work. Lane translated from the Bulaq corpus. In his opinion, "Galland [had] excessively perverted the work". According to Lane, Galland's "acquaintance with Arab manners and customs was insufficient to preserve him always from errors of the grossest description". Working with the Bulaq corpus, Lane occasionally crosschecked against Calcutta I and Breslau corpus. His translation, however, became incomplete. In 1923 a translation by Edward Powys Mathers based on the French translation by J. C. Mardrus appeared.

Another translation attempt was made by John Payne (The Book of the Thousand Nights and One Night, 1882–84). Payne printed only 500 copies, for private distribution, and ceded the work to Richard Francis Burton. Burton's translation (The Book of the Thousand Nights and a Night, 1885–88) enjoyed huge public success, but was also criticised for its use of archaic language and excessive erotic detail. According to Ulrich Marzolph, as of 2004, Burton's translation remains the most complete version of One Thousand and One Nights in English. It is generally considered one of the finest unexpurgated translations from Calcutta II. It stood as the only complete translation of the Macnaghten or Calcutta II edition (Egyptian recension) until the Malcolm C. and Ursula Lyons translation published in 2008.

Sir Richard Francis Burton (with supplements from William Forsell Kirby and William Alexander Clouston) made a complete translation titled The Book of the Thousand Nights and a Night in 16 or 17 volumes (unexpurgated from various editions and corpuses but mainly based on the Calcutta II edition - Egyptian recension, in 1885–88).

A new English language translation by Yasmine Seale was published in December 2021. Seale's was the first transition of the work into English by a female author, who, in this instance, removed passages deemed racist or sexist by her. The new translation includes all the tales from Hanna Diyab as well as stories previously omitted featuring female protagonists, such as the tales of Parizade, Pari Banu, and the horror tale concerning Sidi Numan".

Partial or incomplete translations
Anonymous from Grub Street based on Antoine Galland - The Arabian Nights' Entertainments (1706–21)
Jonathan Scott - The Arabian Nights Entertainments (1811)
Henry Torrens - The first 50 Nights Calcutta II Edition (1838)
Edward William Lane - The Bulaq corpus along with the Calcutta I and Breslau corpus (1838–40)
John Payne - The Book of the Thousand Nights and One Night (unexpurgated) (1882–84) 
Edward Powys Mathers based on J. C. Mardrus in 4 volumes (1923)
Malcolm C. Lyons and Ursula Lyons - The Arabian Nights: Tales of 1001 Nights published by Penguin Books based on the Macnaghten or Calcutta II edition (Egyptian recension) in 10 volumes (2008)
Yasmine Seale (December 2021)

German translations
In 1825 a Galland-based translation was made by Maximilian Habicht. Duncan Black MacDonald later showed that the Tunisian provenance of a manuscript Habicht claimed to use during the translation was a forgery by Habicht. In 1839–1842 One Thousand and One Nights were translated into German by Gustav Weil. From 1895 to 1897, Max Henning published another German translation in 24 small volumes; the first seven volumes were based on the Bulaq edition, while volumes 18–24 were largely translated from Richard Francis Burton. In 1912–13 another translation was made by Felix Paul Greve.

In 1921–1928, Enno Littmann produced a six-volume translation of the whole One Thousand and One Nights based on Calcutta II into German. This included the poetry contained in the text. He translated one lewd portion into Latin, rather than German. Nonetheless, Isaak Filshtinsky considered Littmann's translation to be "the most complete and accomplished". Robert Irwin pronounced it "the best German translation".

In 2004, C. H. Beck published a translation by Claudia Ott of the critical edition of the Galland Manuscript by Muhsin Mahdi. Ott won the Johann-Friedrich-von-Cotta-Literatur- und Übersetzerpreis der Landeshauptstadt Stuttgart for her translation.

Dutch translations
There have been several Dutch translations made from the French editions of Galland and Mardrus. In 1999 the final volume of "De vertellingen van duizend-en-één nacht" was published; the first and so far only Dutch translation from the Arabic texts by Dr. Richard van Leeuwen. For his translation Van Leeuwen used the Bulaq-edition (Cairo 1835), the Calcutta-edition (1842) and the edition by Mahdi (Leiden 1984).

Italian translation
In 1949 Arabist Francesco Gabrieli, who headed the team of anonymous translators, produced the four-volume Italian translation, based on Bulaq collated with Calcutta II.

Spanish translations
The stories about Sinbad the Sailor were translated into Spanish already in 1253. Older Spanish translations were made particularly by Pedro Pedraza (from Galland), Vicente Blasco Ibáñez (from Mardrus), Eugenio Sanz del Valle, and Luis Aguirre Prado, Alfredo Domínguez (from Mardrus). More accurate translations were made by Rafael Cansinos Asséns and the Arabists Juan Vernet, Juan A.G. Larraya and Leonor Martínez Martín or Salvador Peña.

Japanese translations
In the preface Nagamine wrote that he used G. F. Townsend's The Arabian Nights's Entertainments, which was based on Jonathan Scott's English translation of Galland. Nagamine also used Edward William Lane's English translation as a supplement. The second Japanese translation by Inoue Tsutomu, titled Zensekai ichidai kisho (The Most Curious Book in the Whole World), appeared in 1883 and became more popular than Nagamine's.

Subsequently other Japanese translations were made, but the first complete Japanese translation from Arabic was published in 1976–92 by Shinji Maejima and Ikeda Osamu, in nineteen volumes (titled Arabian Naito).

Chinese translations
A selection of stories from One Thousand and One Nights, titled Yi Qian Ling Yi Ye（一千零一夜） appeared in 1900. In 1906 a four-volume translation was made by Xi Ruo（奚若）, published in Shanghai.

In the 1930 new translations, primarily from Bulaq, appeared under the title Yi Qian Ling Yi Ye. In that period a five-volume translation by Na Xun（纳训） was made. In the 1950s Na Xun produced another, three-volume translation titled Yi Qian Ling Yi Ye.

In 1982 a six-volume Beijing edition of Na Xun was published. It became the source of the 1980s two-volume translation titled Tian Fang Ye Tan（天方夜譚）, which appeared in Taipei.

Hebrew translations
In the years 1947-1971 Arabist Yosef Yoel Rivlin produced a 32-volume Hebrew translation, based mainly on Bulaq. A selection of stories, translated by Hanna Amit-Kohavi, appeared in two volumes, in the years 2008 and 2011, under the title Leylot Arav.

Kashmiri translations
Aalif Laila, a translation of the stories in Kashmiri was done by Mohiuddin Hajni in 1969. It published by the Sahitya Akademi - the Indian national academy of letters.

Catalan translations
A complete translation in Catalan language, by arabists Margarida Castells and Dolors Cinca, was published in 1999: Les mil i una nits (Barcelona: Edicions Proa,  / ), in three volumes. It is based in Bulaq edition and includes, as an appendix, the apocryphal tales from Galland. It has been the base for several published antologies.

Bosnian translations
In the year 1999 4-volume of Bosnian translation was published. Bulaq version was translated by Esad Durakovic during the siege of Sarajevo.

Telugu translations
Veyyinnokka Ratrulu (2003), a translation of the stories in Telugu was published by the Sahitya Akademi - the Indian national academy of letters. The translation work was done by writer Ghandikota Brahmaji Rao.

Malayalam translations
Ayirathonnu Raavukal (2011), a single volume translation of the Nights was published by Mathrubhumi Books in Malayalam with Indian literary critic M. Achuthan serving as its editor. Another translation in Malayalam, Ayirathonnu Rathrikal by M. P. Sadasivan, was published by DC Books in 2008.

Meenaketanacharitram (1850–1860), a story by Ayilyam Thirunal Rama Varma, the ruler of the Indian princely state of Travancore, was loosely based on Edward William Lane's translation of "The Story of the Prince Kamar-Ez-Zeman and the Princess Budoor" from the Nights.

Slovenian translation
In the year 2019 3-volume of Slovenian translation was published. Calcutta II version was translated by Mohsen and Margit Alhady.

Notes

References

Further reading

External links
 
 
 
 
 The Thousand Nights and a Night in several classic translations, including the Sir Richard Francis Burton unexpurgated translation and John Payne translation, with additional material.
 1001 Nights
 The Arabian Nights Entertainments, Selected and Edited by Andrew Lang, Longmans, Green and Co., 1918 (1898).
 
 The Arabian Nights, BBC Radio 4 discussion with Robert Irwin, Marina Warner and Gerard van Gelder (In Our Time, October 18, 2007)

One Thousand and One Nights
One Thousand and One Nights
Translation-related lists